Heidi Lucas (born June 3, 1977) is an American attorney and former teen actress.

Biography
During the early 1990s, Lucas played Dina Alexander on Nickelodeon's Salute Your Shorts, which ran from 1991 to 1992. In 1992 she appeared in the 'Fantasy Dating Game' Girls' Club. Created for the Philip's CD-I, Imagination Machine, it allowed girls to go on interactive dates with thirty of the 'coolest guys in the universe'. In 1993, she won the Young Artist Award for best young actress to co-star in a cable series for her role. She also played Noriko "Max" Matsuda in the 1996 sci-fi series Hypernauts.

By 1998, Lucas quit acting, pursuing higher education instead. She currently lives in Arizona and works as an attorney. In 2015, she reunited with most of her Salute Your Shorts cast at Portland, Oregon's Everything is Festival.

Filmography

Television

Lucas appeared in numerous video shorts as well as in the 1992 film Ghost Ship. She also appeared in major commercials for the following companies:

Coca-Cola (1998)
Clearasil (1997)
Sunny Delight (1996)
Noxema (1995 & 1996)
Secret Ultra Dry Deodorant
Johnson & Johnson Persa Gel
Skittles

References

External links

1977 births
Living people
American television actresses
American child actresses
American people of Czech descent
Place of birth missing (living people)
American people of Chinese descent
20th-century American actresses
21st-century American women